Calandrinia calyptrata, the pink purslane or small-leaved parakeelya, is an annual plant in the family Montiaceae. It is endemic to Australia.

The species occurs in Western Australia, South Australia, Victoria, Tasmania and New South Wales.

References

External links
Calandrinia calyptrata photo, CC-by license

calyptrata
Caryophyllales of Australia
Flora of New South Wales
Flora of South Australia
Flora of Tasmania
Flora of Victoria (Australia)
Eudicots of Western Australia
Taxa named by Joseph Dalton Hooker